English Art (British Art) Collection in National Museum of Serbia includes painters usually from the late 19th century, mostly impressionist and post-impressionist. The vast majority of the collection was donated by Prince Paul of Yugoslavia before World War II.The collection has 64 paintings and watercolors and 51 graphics and etchings. They include painters such as Alfred Sisley, Charles Conder, Philip Wilson Steer, Walter Sickert, Hermione Hammond, James Bolivar Manson, Wyndham Lewis, Roger Fry, Duncan Grant, Vanessa Bell and Rowland Fisher, and graphic works from William Hogarth etc.

George Morland, Stable with Boars
Clarkson Frederick Stanfield, Sea with Fishermans Sailboats (1862)
Frank Holl, Return from Walking (1877)
Alfred Sisley, Barges on the Loing
Charles Conder, On the beach
Philip Wilson Steer, Forest
Ethel Walker, Sea
Charles Sims (painter), Amor and Woman (watercolor), After Bath (tempera)
Cedric Morris, North African Landscape
Walter Sickert, Street in Dieppe, Dieppe
Hermione Hammond, Trafalgar Square (watercolor)
Wilfrid de Glehn, Architecture of One Church
George Clausen, A summer morning
George Frederic Watts, Lady Garvagh
John Lavery, Fireplace
Gwen John, Interior with White Table
James Bolivar Manson, Still Life with Flowers, View from Houton Sussex
Christopher Wood (English painter), Still Life with White Vase and Flowers
Henry Lamb, Square
Augustus John, Infaint portrait Beatrice
Duncan Grant, Sunny Countryside, Haystacks
William Rothenstein, Laurence of Arabia Portrait 1921 (canvas)
Roger Fry, Nude on the Spring 1921
Henry Tonks, Man and Woman on Yarn (watercolor)
Vanessa Bell, Roofs
John Nash (artist), Ships in Port, Floweres on the Window
John George Brown, Still Life with Flowers
Graham Sutherland, Landscape from South Wales
Rowland Fisher, Mill

References

External links 
 Official site
Free Database with all works and descriptions in Museum

Collections of the National Museum of Serbia